Martin Luther King Jr. High School is a public high school located in unincorporated DeKalb County, Georgia, United States, with a Lithonia postal address. It opened in August 2001 as the newest high school in the DeKalb County School System, and was named after the late civil rights leader Martin Luther King Jr..

Its boundary includes a portion of Stonecrest.

Development
The school was opened to alleviate overcrowding in surrounding middle schools.  It originally included only grades 6-7 and 9-10.  Tenth grade students came from Lithonia and Southwest DeKalb High Schools to relieve crowding and also due to the rezoning of DeKalb County. The following year, after a protest by the high school students, the school dropped the sixth and seventh graders and added eighth grade.  It became a pure high school with grades 9-12 in the 2003-2004 school year.

MLK's current principal is Harvey.

Feeder school
Salem Middle School is the middle school feeder to MLK.

International Baccalaureate Diploma
MLK implemented the International Baccalaureate Diploma program during the 2004-2005 school year, and it continues to produce top students each year.

Awards and recognition

The MLK band has received superior ratings in every facet of performance since the school's inception in 2001. Including concert band, jazz band, and marching band.  The MLK Wind Ensemble performed in the 2011 Music for All/Bands of America National Concert Band Festival.  The MLK marching band known as the "Kings of Halftime" has traveled to South Africa (2006) and the AT&T Cotton Bowl (2007). The band attended the Ohio State Buckeye Invitational in 2014. The "Kings of Halftime" have also performed in the 2017 Tournament of Roses Parade in Pasadena, CA and the 2019 Macy's Thanksgiving Day Parade in New York City.

The MLK Drama team won the Region 2-AAAAA championship in the One-Act Play competition in 2006.

The MLK football team has been to the state playoffs every year since it has been a full high school, compiling a remarkable 56-18 record over six years, which is the best record in Georgia football history for a high school in its first six years of existence.

The MLK football team were the 2010-2011 Region 2-AAAAA champions, upsetting the Stephenson Jaguars perfect season in a 50-49 victory. This victory led the Lions to the playoffs, where they were defeated in the second round by Colquitt County Packers. They have been Region Champions for three consecutive years.

The MLK wrestling team has been acknowledged for their excellence. Laron Taylor placed first at the County tournament at 165 lb. and Wesley Warren placed second at county tournament at 103 lb.

The MLK girls' track and field team won the state championships in 2010-2011, beating Westlake.

Notable alumni
 Crime Mob, southern rap group- 
 Cedric Hunter, professional baseball player (San Diego Padres)
 Kevin Byard, professional football player (Tennessee Titans)
 Mack Brown, professional football player (Minnesota Vikings)

External links
 Martin Luther King Jr. High School homepage
 MLK Athletics page

References 

DeKalb County School District high schools
2001 establishments in Georgia (U.S. state)
Educational institutions established in 2001